Formose Mendy (born 23 March 1989) is a professional footballer who plays as a winger for Austrian club FC Mauerwerk.

He played club football in France, Spain, England, Finland, Egypt and Austria, for Lens, Istres, Puertollano, Sporting de Gijón, Blackpool, HJK, Adana Demirspor, Alassiouty, Raja, Admira Landhaus and Mauerwerk.

Born in Senegal, Mendy represented Guinea-Bissau at international level.

Early and personal life
Mendy was born in Guédiawaye, Senegal to a father that had numerous wives and 25 children. He emigrated to Marseille, France, at the age of seven, to live with an aunt.

Club career

France
Mendy played youth football for Septème-les-Vallons, Lyon, Consolat and Lens, and started his senior career in France with Lens B and Istres. After finishing his loan deal with the latter club, being part of the squad that won promotion to Ligue 2, he was released by the former.

Spain
Mendy arrived in Spain in the summer of 2009, signing for Puertollano in Segunda División B. After just one season he joined another team in the same division, Sporting de Gijón's reserve side.

Following a change of management at the Asturias team in 2012, Mendy was promoted to the main squad. He made his La Liga debut on 25 February 2012 in a 1–1 away draw against Racing de Santander, and added a further nine appearances (often as a starter) as the campaign ended in relegation; additionally, he scored four goals for the B's, who finished in tenth position in the third level.

England and Finland
On 29 September 2014, Mendy signed a season-long deal with Blackpool in the Football League Championship. On 20 April of the following year he joined Finnish club HJK Helsinki, scoring his first goal for his new team on 14 May in a 1–0 home victory over IFK Mariehamn, after entering as a substitute.

Later years
On 1 January 2016, Mendy signed a one-and-a-half-year contract with Adana Demirspor in the Turkish TFF First League. He competed in Egyptian football in the following years, first with Alassiouty in the Second Division then Raja in the Premier League.

International career
As his grandfather hailed from the country, Mendy chose to represent Guinea-Bissau internationally, making his debut on 7 February 2011 against Gambia.

References

External links

Formose Mendy at ÖFB

1989 births
Living people
Senegalese people of Bissau-Guinean descent
Senegalese footballers
Citizens of Guinea-Bissau through descent
Bissau-Guinean footballers
Association football wingers
Championnat National players
Olympique Lyonnais players
RC Lens players
FC Istres players
La Liga players
Segunda División players
Segunda División B players
CD Puertollano footballers
Sporting de Gijón B players
Sporting de Gijón players
English Football League players
Blackpool F.C. players
Veikkausliiga players
Helsingin Jalkapalloklubi players
TFF First League players
Adana Demirspor footballers
Egyptian Premier League players
Pyramids FC players
El Raja SC players
FC Mauerwerk players
Guinea-Bissau international footballers
Bissau-Guinean expatriate footballers
Expatriate footballers in France
Expatriate footballers in Spain
Expatriate footballers in England
Expatriate footballers in Finland
Expatriate footballers in Turkey
Expatriate footballers in Egypt
Expatriate footballers in Austria
Bissau-Guinean expatriate sportspeople in France
Bissau-Guinean expatriate sportspeople in Spain
Bissau-Guinean expatriate sportspeople in England
Bissau-Guinean expatriates in Finland
Bissau-Guinean expatriate sportspeople in Turkey
Bissau-Guinean expatriate sportspeople in Egypt
Bissau-Guinean expatriates in Austria